Jüri Parijõgi (until 1935 Jüri Parinbak or Jüri Parinbach; 2 September 1892 – 9 July 1941) was an Estonian children's writer and teacher. He is regarded as the first Estonian writer who wrote almost only for children and young people.

He took part in World War I and in the Estonian War of Independence.

From 1929 to 1931 he studied in the Faculty of Philosophy at University of Tartu.

He died on 9 July 1941 in Tartu Prison, being a victim of the mass murder by the NKVD.

Works
 1926: story "Semendivabrik" ('Cement Works')
 1930: story "Jaksuküla poisid" ('The Jaksuküla Boys')
 1937: story "Teraspoiss" ('Steel Boy')

References

1892 births
1941 deaths
Estonian children's writers
Estonian male writers
20th-century Estonian writers
Estonian educators
Estonian people executed by the Soviet Union
Estonian people who died in prison custody
Estonian military personnel of the Estonian War of Independence
People from Viru-Nigula Parish